John Pope House may refer to:

John Pope House (Springfield, Kentucky), listed on the National Register of Historic Places in Washington County, Kentucky
John Pope House (Burwood, Tennessee), listed on the National Register of Historic Places in Williamson County, Tennessee